Montgomery Park is an office building and former Montgomery Ward mail-order catalog warehouse and department store located in Portland, Oregon, United States, built in 1920. It is listed on the National Register of Historic Places under its historic name Montgomery Ward & Company Building. The building is located on property once used for the Lewis and Clark Centennial Exposition, of 1905. It was occupied by Montgomery Ward from 1920 until 1985, although the majority of the company's operations at this location ended in 1982.

Description and original uses
At the time of its completion, in September 1920, the building was the largest in the city, as measured by floor space, which was approximately  originally.  A  wing was added to the building's northwest corner in 1935–36, changing what had been an L-shaped building to a roughly U-shaped one.  The building has nine floors plus a basement.  The 4th through  9th floors were used almost exclusively as warehouse space, while most portions of the 2nd and 3rd floors functioned as office and mail-order workspace. The first floor was used primarily for loading and unloading of freight arriving and leaving by truck or rail and temporary storage of such goods.  Three rail spurs served the facility, extending into the ground floor.  Among other things, the building is known for its large steel-framed roof sign, the largest sign in Portland, which was constructed in 1925.

Retail store

Retail service at this location was relatively limited in its first years. A 1936 expansion added retail space, covering a variety of goods, occupying a new mezzanine floor and parts of the 2nd and 3rd floors.  A tire store was opened  in an adjacent annex.  In the post-World War II years, the Vaughn Street store's business declined steadily.  An increasing proportion of the store's customers were attracted to new suburban shopping malls, and in the early 1970s Montgomery Ward began to follow the same path itself, opening stores at Mall 205 and Jantzen Beach Mall, along with a stand-alone store in Beaverton.  The Northwest Portland store closed in July 1976, and the building remained in use only for warehouse and mail-order functions and as a "catalog overstock outlet".  In 1978, the company built a new warehouse in Portland's Rivergate Industrial District, and in 1982 it closed the Northwest Portland warehouse, eliminating 500 jobs at the site.  Only the small "clearance outlet" store continued to operate, and following the 1984 sale of the building, that store closed finally in July 1985.

Renovation

In 1984, the building was acquired by the Norcrest China Company, a Portland property development company owned by Bill Naito and his brother Sam Naito.  In 1985, the Naitos initiated a rehabilitation and refitting of the building's interior for use for trade shows, banquets and offices.  As part of the renovations, the building was renamed "Montgomery Park".  The "notoriously frugal" Bill Naito liked the new name, because it meant that only the "W" and "D" of "Ward" in the huge 14-letter neon rooftop sign needed to be altered, with "P" and "K" letters. The sign was changed in May 1986, at which time most of the renovations also were completed and the building opened for regular use for trade shows, among other uses.

See also
 National Register of Historic Places listings in Northwest Portland, Oregon

References

External links

1920 establishments in Oregon
Buildings and structures completed in 1920
Buildings and structures in Portland, Oregon
Montgomery Ward
National Register of Historic Places in Portland, Oregon
Northwest District, Portland, Oregon
Portland Historic Landmarks